Jibannagar is an upazila of Chuadanga District in the Division of Khulna, Bangladesh.

Geography
It has 22628 households and total area 199.32 km2. Jibannagar Upazila has an area of 199.32 km2. The main rivers located in Jibannagar are Bhairab River and Kobadak River.

Jibannagar Upazila is bounded by Chuadanga Sadar Upazila on the north, Kotchandpur Upazila, in Jhenaidah District, on the east, Maheshpur Upazila, in Jhenaidah District, on the south, and Hanskhali CD Block, in Nadia District, West Bengal, India, on the west.

Demographics
According to 2011 Bangladesh census, Jibannagar had a population of 179,581. Males constituted 50.03% of the population and females 49.97. Muslims formed 96.49% of the population, Hindus 2.48%, Christians 1.03% and others 0.19%. Jibannagar had a literacy rate of 46.14% for the population 7 years and above.

As of the 1991 Bangladesh census, Jibannagar has a population of 125,102. Males constitute 51.32% of the population, and females 48.68%. This Upazila's eighteen up population is 61,511.

Administration
Jibannagar Upazila is divided into Jibannagar Municipality and seven union parishads: Andulbaria, Banka, Hasadah, KDK, Raypur, Shimanto, and Uthali. The union parishads are subdivided into 76 mauzas and 82 villages.

Jibannagar Municipality is subdivided into 9 wards and 9 mahallas.

School 
Kashipur Secondary School
Jibonnagar Thana Pilot Girls School
 Monohorpur secondary School
 B C K M P Secondary School
 Roypur Secondary School
 Hasadah Secondary School
 Uthali Secondary School
 Shaplakali Ideal School
 Jibannagar Degree College
 Jibannagar Girl's Degree College
 Dhopakhali High School
 Jibonnagar Thana modal high School
 Karatoa High School
 Shahapur high school
 Minajpur secondary school
 Rainbow Grammar School

See also
Upazilas of Bangladesh
Districts of Bangladesh
Divisions of Bangladesh

References

Upazilas of Chuadanga District
Chuadanga District
Khulna Division